Mekeme Tamla Ladji, simply known as Zito, (born 19 September 1985) is an Ivorian footballer. Currently, he plays for Levadiakos.

Tamla previously played for K.S.K. Beveren in the Belgian First Division and for Le Mans in Ligue 2.

References

1985 births
Living people
Ivorian footballers
K.S.K. Beveren players
Footballers at the 2008 Summer Olympics
Olympic footballers of Ivory Coast
ASEC Mimosas players
Maccabi Petah Tikva F.C. players
Levadiakos F.C. players
Expatriate footballers in Israel
Israeli Premier League players
Footballers from Abidjan
Association football midfielders